The 1987 Campeonato Brasileiro Série A was the 31st edition of the Campeonato Brasileiro Série A, better known as Campeonato Brasileiro.

The Campeonato Brasileiro Série A in 1987 was commonly given the name of Copa União, by which it was known, but had the official name of Copa Brasil. The competition was divided by CBF in modules: the Green Module won by Flamengo and with Internacional runner-up; the Yellow Module, of which the champion was Sport and vice-champion Guarani. Champions and runners up of those two modules were to form the final quadrangular. The Blue and White modules formed the equivalent of the Série B.

Flamengo and Internacional, champions and runners-up of the Green Module, abdicated to participate from the final quadrangular as part of an agreement made by all clubs of the Green Module, forfeiting their berths in the final phase and having their scheduled matches ruled as W.O.

Background
The origins of the championship date back to 1986. The rules of the 1986 Campeonato Brasileiro determined that the championship would have 80 clubs, divided in four groups of eleven clubs (A, B, C, and D) and four groups of 9 clubs (E, F, G, and H). The six first-placed teams in the A, B, C and D groups would be joined by the best four non-qualified teams, regardless of group, in those same groups, and the champions of groups E, F, G, and H in the second phase. In that year, it was also determined that the 1987 Campeonato Brasileiro would have 24 clubs, those being the six best teams in each of the four groups in the second phase. However, Vasco da Gama, after being eliminated in the first phase, attempted to get Joinville's berth in the second phase, since Joinville had won the points of a draw against Sergipe due to one player of Sergipe having been caught in an anti-doping test. If that extra point was taken from Joinville, Joinville would fall to 8th place in the group, and Vasco would qualify due to having a better goal difference. As an attempted solution, CBF gave berths in the second phase to both Vasco and Joinville, eliminating Portuguesa, that had appealed to the common courts in an unrelated case about ticket sales. After being threatened with the withdrawal of the clubs from São Paulo, CBF reversed its decision and enlarged the second stage to 36 clubs, qualifying Vasco da Gama, Náutico, Santa Cruz and Sobradinho. Because of that, the 1987 championship was enlarged to 28 clubs.

As of March 1987, the teams in the First Division would be the seven best-placed teams in each group in the Second stage of the 1986 championship: America-RJ, Atlético-GO, Atlético Mineiro, Atlético-PR, Bahia, Bangu, Ceará, Corinthians, Criciúma, CSA, Flamengo, Fluminense, Goiás, Grêmio, Guarani, Inter de Limeira, Internacional, Joinville, Náutico, Palmeiras, Portuguesa, Rio Branco, São Paulo, Santa Cruz, Santos, Treze Futebol Clube and Vasco da Gama. The other eight eliminated teams (Botafogo, Central, Comercial-MS, Nacional-AM, Ponte Preta, Sobradinho, Sport Recife and Vitória) plus Coritiba, Operário-MS and Remo, would join the other 21 best-placed teams in the 1987 State championships in the 1987 Second Division. Around the same time, Botafogo was still attempting to place itself in the First Level, taking Joinville's place.

In June 1987, STJD accepted Botafogo's request to be included in the 1987 championship, however, not confirming Joinville's relegation. Soon after this decision, other clubs such as Coritiba and Sobradinho requested their inclusion in the championship, with Coritiba's request being accepted as well.

In July, Octávio Pinto Guimarães, President of CBF, declared that the entity couldn't pay for the expenses of the clubs unless it found a sponsor, and thus, the clubs would have to pay for their expenses themselves. Otherwise, CBF would have to organize a regional championship to reduce the costs of the trips, to avoid not organizing the championship, since this would an admission of incompetence.

On July 4, 1987, at Morumbi, the Clube dos 13 (Club of the Thirteen in Portuguese) brought together representatives of the thirteen greatest football clubs in the country at the time. The founding members were Corinthians, Palmeiras, São Paulo, Santos, Flamengo, Vasco da Gama, Fluminense, Botafogo, Atlético Mineiro, Cruzeiro, Internacional, Grêmio and Bahia, which according to a survey by the Journal of the season in Brazil together accounted for 95% of all fans of Brazilian football. And according to the ranking of the CBF, also were the 13 clubs with the best records since 1971. The host of the event, Carlos Miguel Aidar, was also elected president of the new entity, remaining in office until April 1990. Thus, the Clube dos 13 organized the Copa União, which would represent the Brazilian Championship that year. The creation of the Copa União came after a reconciliation between the CBF and the Clube dos 13, since a break with the entity could trigger reactions in FIFA. In order to round out the number of participants, the Clube dos 13 invited Coritiba, Santa Cruz and Goiás, that had the best records in the Brazilian Championship and were the most popular teams in their respective states.

To honor their policy commitments with other national federations in 1987, CBF would organize two championships that were nominated as modules: "Yellow" - considered by several media outlets the Second Division - which would consist of 14 teams that were left out of the Clube dos 13 tournament, along with Vitória and Sport, demoted in 1986. The modules "Blue" and "White" - considered by several media outlets to Third Division - which represent the Second Division. The modules "Blue" and "White" would serve as qualifiers to the Second Division in 1988.

To reconcile the interests of CBF with the Clube dos 13, Copa Union would be called "Green Module" and, in principle, these clubs called "Yellow Module" that fought a championship would be parallel to the Union Cup for the Club 13 (and for much of the sporting press, only the second division of Brasileirão that year), but in the end there should be a crossover between the champions and runners-up in both tournaments to decide who would be the two representatives of Brazil that would dispute the Copa Libertadores America the following year. However, the formula of contention was not accepted by the clubs in Module Yellow, who wanted the Brazilian champion also be defined in such a crossover. The president of the Football Federation of Pernambuco, Fred Oliveira, even declared that the teams in module yellow "will not take the field until you set the crossover module still in 1987". Nevertheless, a preliminary version of the regulation was defined unilaterally on 9 September meeting with Club 13 at the Hotel Transamérica, in São Paulo. This regulation provided the only crossing between modules to define the Brazilian representatives in the Libertadores 1988.

Though apparently it seemed absurd, there was no reluctance about this proposal and the impasse occurred as resolved. But in late September, CBF began to consider also the "Module Yellow" as first division along with Copa União (called by CBF the "Green Module"). The change of regulation proposed by the CBF would be that this crossover between the champions and runners-up of these two divisions would also decide who was the Brazilian champion of 1987. However, there was no agreement and this led to a major controversy. There is also a regulation of Clube dos 13, not stamped by CBF, dated August 6 and another with the final regulation, officiated by CBF and disclosed only on the 1st of October (with the championship already under way) without the approval of the 13 Club and clubs in Module Green, also stating that the champion would be decided in the square, to be held in January 1988. What went against resolução 16/86 which required that the CND championships began and ended the same year. Exceptions only when notified by the federations, which would not have made the CBF to extend the Brazilian championship 1987 until January 1988.

Eurico Miranda, vice president of football Vasco da Gama (at the time) would have given reason for confusion on behalf of the association by signing a document which provided the crossing when it was proposed by the CBF as an interlocutor in the 13 Club entity, however, the Clube dos 13 only heard the news via press release the following day. Still, there had never been an understanding between the two parties: the Club 13 and the other representatives of the clubs in contention for Copa Union never recognized or signed any document accepting the amendment of the regulation that was proposed by the confederation which required the participants crossing between the two modules. As well as the clubs Module Yellow, who even before the start of competition, always explicitly stood against no crossing of groups and later also demanded that the champion (and not just the Brazilian representatives in the Libertadores 1988) was set in the square. According to Eurico Miranda, a representative of the Clube dos 13 at the time, it has signed an agreement for the competition, and what was signed was in conjunction with the members of the Club of 13, according to what was the regulation of CBF.

Ironically the regulation imposed by the CBF which provided a cross between the champions and vice champions of each module, however, would become unviable in the long run, because in the Yellow module was not defined who was the vice champion, the finalists Sport and Guarani, after extra time in the shootout tied at 11-11 and shared the title in an agreement between themselves.
Not contrary to the rules or risk of punishment by the CBF, the Guarani was willing to abdicate Yellow title module. According to a lower court decision in the 10th Federal Court of the Judicial Section of Pernambuco, CBF, possession of regulation and tiebreakers, said Sport were champion based on their best campaign. Already the newspapers Diário de Pernambuco and Journal of Commercio reported that on January 22, 1988, the Guarani relinquished the title. The Union Cup of 87 organized by the Clube dos 13 had average paying audience of 20,877, the second largest in history the national championship.

In December 1987, the CBF announced this square table, that would be played in round robin and. On January 14, 1988, the 10th Federal Court Section Judicial Pernambuco upheld a lawsuit injunction filed by Sport to ensure the implementation of resolution 16/86 of the CND, which provided, in its Article 5, that any decision making in the Council of Arbitration, convened by Flamengo, would only be valid in case of unanimity. The following day, 29 of the 32 clubs of the modules Green and Yellow attended the Arbitration Council. According to the Journal story from Brazil, Sport, Guarani, Nautico, Criciuma, Joinville, CSA and Treze voted for maintaining the crossing. However, according to the Diário de Pernambuco article, only Sport, Guarani, Nautical, Fluminense and Vasco were in favor of the square. Although there is no unanimity, the CND was against the crossing, contradicting the resolution of the entity itself. Claiming that the regulation was amended in the absence of Clube dos 13, Flamengo and International-RS with support of the 13 Club and Carlos Miguel Aidar, refused to dispute the crossing imposed by CBF. It was not a simple choice of Flamengo and Internacional, but the fulfillment of a determination of the 13 Club and the Union Cup regulation, which was created by the same entity. Thus, any of the clubs that reached the Grand Final should do the same. On January 29, 1988, CBF held a meeting in their own seat, with almost all the presidents of federations (only Fred de Oliveira-PE and Rubens Hoffmeister-RS did not attend) to examine the accounts of the CBF and try to establish a punishment for if Flamengo and International did not play the quadrangular. Under the protests of Flamengo fans, camped in front of the building of the CBF, it has received a vote of confidence of all present "because it demands respect for the Regulation of the Brazilian Championship ". On the same day, the Flamengo Regatta Club filed an appeal in regular courts asking not to be forced to play the intersection. The request was compiled by Judge Tanya de Melo Bastos of 1st Federal Court of Rio de Janeiro. The CBF then threatened to punish the carioca team for failing to contest the quadrangular (after the team was backed in court) but by joining the common law, as well as the Sport.

With that Sport and Guarani competed in the quadrangular, winning games against Flamengo and International by WO. The CBF declared Sport as Brazilian champion of 1987, while the Club 13, the Arbitration Council and CND did the same with Flamengo. The CBF and Guarani proclaimed Sport, respectively and Guarani vice champion that year, to represent Brazil in the Libertadores Cup. And the case was taken to the ordinary justice system, this, res judicata to the Sport Club do Recife. Ie senteça became permanent for the facts alleged and proven in court during the proceedings. But how is a figure of legal certainty and new facts before the adverse party can question the final decision.

However, both the CBF itself as FIFA can, if they so decide, take action against clubs who have recourse to ordinary courts. FIFA will not interfere judging or determining the titles of any club in any country that is, but it also does not consider that the ordinary courts are competent to hear a case and usually punish sports clubs that trigger the same. However, even with Flamengo's request to FIFA to intervene in the case and the punishment of Sport-PE, FIFA chose not to get involved in the case and not punish the Sport-PE. The following year, the CBF takes responsibility for organizing the Campeonato Brasileiro with leading clubs in the country who would be calling again for Copa União, thus keeping the same name of the competition which was held at Club 13. In 2000, again the Brazilian Championship is organized by the Clube dos 13. Tournament has become known as Copa João Havelange.

On February 21, 2011 CBF decides finally end the controversy by declaring Flamengo and Sport as champions of 1987 and as vice-champions, respectively, Guarani and Internacional. However, this recognition has not occurred for technical reasons. Important part of active sports press in 2011 attributes this recognition to the CBF interests and political maneuvering in order to weaken the Clube dos 13, which was in the process of organizing a new bidding process for the sale of broadcasting rights of Brazilian Football. This part of the press never questioned the legitimacy of the title of Flamengo in 1987, but recognition by the CBF title in 2011.

When in 2011 the CBF recognized as Brazilian co-champion Flamengo in 1987, presented the justification that "the decision, made after new and convincing arguments presented by the legal department of Flamengo, the recognition that in 1987 there were two national championships, which had Sport and Flamengo as champions ". That is, since 1987, CBF has always insisted that both modules, Green and Yellow, were two halves of the same league. In 2011, based on "new and compelling arguments presented by the legal department of the Flemish", these arguments have not been disclosed either by the CBF nor for Flamengo to evaluate if indeed they are "new and compelling", CBF decided to change its word about the subject, a word that has come since 1987, always in the direction that in 1987 there was only one champion of Brazil and that this was the Flamengo. According to CBF, the decision of 2011 to recognize Flamengo as co-champion of Brazil 1987 was made based on authoritative legal pronouncements legal pronouncements that are identified, quoted and transcribed by CBF in its Board Resolution which recognized Brazilian champion as Flamengo in 1987. Resolution of this Board, CBF admitted that the goal was not to make recognition of "Cold Justice" to the historical facts "hurt whom hurt" but pacify the controversy for anyone to get upset: "Considering that the goal of the CBF, as an entity of the maximum degree of the organizational structure of Brazilian football, to edit the quoted RDP 03/2010, was to pacify a longtime controversial topic that can arouse discord ..."

On June 14, 2011, the CBF did not comply with the decision of the 10th Federal Court of First Instance of the Judiciary Section of Pernambuco, therefore Sport Clube do Recife was recognized as the Brazilian champion of Série B, and Clube de Regatas do Flamengo as the only Brazilian soccer champion in 1987.

I Copa União/Green Module (Taça João Havelange)

The CBF did not organize the Union Cup, that tournament was organized by the Club of 13 that had Regulation and cup itself. Module Green was only renamed after the FIFA Union decides to organize another championship and propose a modification of regulations providing for the intersection between the two competitions, which were being organized in parallel. The Regulation of Copa Union that was created by the 13 Club was not on the division of the competition in two modules (or crossover between the two competitions). But the CBF and the clubs since the start of negotiating together for the event, even before the creation of the Club of 13, (which then also started to negotiate but only wanting the big clubs participating). Prior to that CBF had found problems with money, suggesting the clubs finance themselves or accomplish a lean championship, with a few trips, regionalized. Finally, on 03/09/1987 CBF that has the exclusive right to organize, according to law, announced the agreement with the clubs, with the 1st division with 32 clubs (16 +16) and crossover quadrangular. However, the next day the club of 13 made a proposal to the CBF, with regulation being done by the Clube dos 13, Brazilian champion and the module green, there is crossover between the modules, only for definition of the representatives in the Libertadores. Against the wishes CBF, however, gave this to the 16 clubs in Module Green to accept according to the Jornal do Brazil of 03/09/1987.

According to the Jornal do Brazil of 04/09/1987, the Federation proposed the way that the league would have 4 different champions. The CBF accepted, however, there was still some adjustments in the table and in the regulation, and there is a "political detail" on the square that would define the clubs in the Libertadores, would not be the "champion and vice champion". On the eve of the opening match, the clubs of module yellow still claimed that the intersection between modules for defining the representatives of Brazil in the Libertadores was maintained, according to the Jornal do Brazil, and requirements concerning the financial part of the event, and promised to go to court if they were not met. According to the newspaper O Estado de S. Paulo the day 09.04.1987, the agreement between CBF and clubs was "officially 64 teams divided into 4 groups of 16, and were unofficially divided into 4 divisions. 1st division in which CBF insist on calling "green Module" and will be the 13 teams that comprise the "Group of 13". According to the newspaper O Estado de S. Paulo of 05/09/1987, the TV contract of the 13 Club to say that games Module Green (16 clubs) Copa Brazil would be transmitted on TV. However, there was a CND resolution that established a maximum quota of 20 clubs per division and prevent a league with 32 clubs in First Division. But at the beginning of the contest, with the resolutions 16,17, and 18 CND came into force as of the resolutions re-established, which became mandatory in the presence of the 28 official championship clubs in 1986.

VI Copa Brasil/Yellow Module (Taça Roberto Gomes Pedrosa)

Also called Taça Roberto Gomes Pedrosa, it counted with the participation of the best-placed teams of the 1986 Championship that hadn't been invited into the Copa União, except for Ponte Preta. However, América refused to participate in the Yellow Module; all its matches were counted as 0-1 defeats. Ultimately, América was invited to the 1988 First Level, along with the seven best-placed teams of the Yellow Module.

First round

Group A

Group B

Second round

Group A

Group B

Semifinals

Finals

Final phase

NB: Sport Recife and Guarani top-2 from the Yellow Module entered the playoff with the Green Module (Copa União) top-2 ordered by CBF, but Flamengo and International-RS
refused to play. Sport Recife and Guarani then played two games.

1st Leg
Date: January 30, 1988
Score: Guarani 1X1 Sport
Venue: Brinco de Ouro (Campinas)
Referee: Carlos Elias Pimentel (RJ)
Goals: Betão (penalty) 52' and Catatau (pen) 62'.
Attendance: 4.627
GUARANI: Sérgio Neri, Giba, Luciano, Ricardo Rocha, Albéris (Gil Baiano), Paulo Isidoro, Nei (Carlinhos), Boiadeiro; Catatau, Mário Maguila e João Paulo.
Coach: José Luís Carbone.
SPORT: Flávio, Betão, Estevam, Marco Antonio, Zé Carlos Macaé, Rogério, Zico e Ribamar (Disco), Robertinho, Nando (Augusto) e Neco.
Coach: Jair Picerni.

2nd Leg
Date: February 7, 1988
Score: Sport 1X0 Guarani
Venue: Ilha do Retiro (Recife);
Referee: Luís Carlos Félix (RJ);
Attendance: 26.282 espectadores;
Goal: Marco Antônio 64';
Yellow Cards: Paulo Isidoro, Catatau e Ricardo Rocha;
Red Cards: Evair 45 min do 1º tempo.
SPORT: Flávio, Betão, Estevam, Marco Antônio, Zé Carlos Macaé; Rogério, Ribamar (Augusto), Zico; Robertinho, Nando e Neco.
Coach: Jair Picerni.
GUARANI: Sérgio Néri, Gil Baiano, Luciano, Ricardo Rocha, Albéris; Paulo Isidoro, Nei (Carlinhos), Marco Antônio Boiadeiro; Catatau (Mário), Evair e João Paulo.
Coach: Carbone.

Sport Recife were declared the 1987 Brazilian champions by CBF. 
Sport and Guarani qualified to 1988 Copa Libertadores.

Champion

References

Sources
 1987 Campeonato Brasileiro Série A at RSSSF
 RSSSF Brasil

1987
1987 in Brazilian football
Brazil
Bra